Fan Jung-yu (born 7 January 1995) is a Taiwanese female badminton player. She represented Chinese Taipei at the 2013 Summer Deaflympics and in the 2017 Summer Deaflympics.

Fan secured her first Deaflympic medal after claiming the gold medal in the women's singles event at the 2013 Summer Deaflympics and also clinched a silver medal in the women's doubles at the 2017 Summer Deaflympics.

Fan is affected with Treacher Collins syndrome since her childhood age and has been confronting with breathing and hearing problems due to Treacher Collins syndrome.

References 

1995 births
Living people
Taiwanese female badminton players
Deaf badminton players
Deaflympic competitors for Chinese Taipei
20th-century Taiwanese women
21st-century Taiwanese women